The 2016 Santosh Trophy was the 70th edition of the Santosh Trophy, the main state competition in Indian football. The qualifiers for the tournament took place from 6 February and the final of the tournament proper was held in Nagpur from 13 March 2016.

Round and dates

Qualified Teams

The following 10 teams have qualified for the Santosh Trophy proper.

 Assam 
 Goa
 Jammu & Kashmir
 Maharashtra
 Mizoram
 Punjab
 Railways
 Services
 Tamil Nadu
 West Bengal

Group stage

Group A

Fixtures and Results

Group B

Fixtures and Results

Knockout stage

Semi-finals

Final

Goalscorers
4 Goals
 Narohari Shreshta (West Bengal)

3 Goals

 A Raegan (Tamil Nadu)
 Arjun Tudu (Services)
 Mohammed Shabaz Pathan (Maharashtra)

2 Goals

 Jagtar Singh (Railways)
 Malsawmfela (Mizoram)
 Sheikh Faiz (West Bengal)
 Shrikant Veramullu (Maharashtra)

1 Goal

 Aaron D'costa (Maharashtra)
 Altamash Syed (Jammu & Kashmir)
 Angelo Colaco (Goa)
 Appuruba Phukan (Assam)
 Anil Kisku (Railways)
 Beevan D'Mello (Goa)
 Dipendu Dowary (West Bengal)
 Edwin Sydney (Tamil Nadu)
 Farukh Chowdhary (Jammu & Kashmir)
 Francis Fernandes (Goa)
 Francis Zoununtluanga (Services)
 Kali Alaudeen (Tamil Nadu)
 K Lal Thanthanga (Mizoram)
 Lalkhapuimawia (Mizoram)
 Laldingngheta (Mizoram)
 Lalmunsanga (Mizoram)
 Milagres Gonsalves (Goa)
 MS Dawngliana (Mizoram)
 Pawan Kumar Tiwari (Punjab)
 P Jain (Services)
 Pradeep Mohanraj (Tamil Nadu)
 Raynier Fernandes (Maharashtra)
 Rowilson Rodrigues (Goa)
 Shahnwaz Bashir (Jammu & Kashmir)
 Soosairaj (Tamil Nadu)
 Syed Shoaib (Jammu & Kashmir)
 Vijith Shetty (Maharashtra)
 Vipin (Services)
 Vijay Kumar (Punjab)
 Vivek Kumar (Services)

Notable players

References

 
Santosh Trophy seasons
2015–16 domestic association football cups